"", originally "Lascia la spina, cogli la rosa", is an Italian-language soprano aria by composer George Frideric Handel that has become a popular concert piece.

History
Its melody is first found in act 3 of Handel's 1705 opera Almira as a sarabande; the score for this can be seen on page 81 of  Vol. 55 of Friedrich Chrysander. Handel then used the tune for the aria "Lascia la spina, cogli la rosa", or "Leave the Thorn, Take the Rose", for the character Piacere in part 2 of his 1707 oratorio Il trionfo del Tempo e del Disinganno (which was much later, in 1737, revised as Il trionfo del Tempo e della Verità).

Four years after that, in 1711, Handel used the music again, this time for his London opera Rinaldo and its act 2 aria "Lascia ch'io pianga" ("Let me weep"), a heartfelt plea for her liberty addressed by the character Almirena to her abductor Argante. Rinaldo was a triumph, and it is with this work that the aria is chiefly associated.

Music
In the first edition published by John Walsh, the orchestration is unspecified, giving only a solo melody line above an unfigured bass line. There is the mention 'violins' at bar 23 where the singer breaks (bar 31 in most modern editions which include an 8-bar introduction). Chrysander claimed to have worked from Handel's 'performance score' and stated that the autograph manuscript had been lost (although RISM state that the British Library hold a fragment of the autograph missing 53 bars); Chrysander's edition shows two violins and a viola with a cello. He does not provide figuring for the continuo. It is not clear whether he invented the additional string parts himself (as he often did) or found them in the performance score to which he referred. Most modern editions seem to be based upon Chrysander's version, as can be seen from the different placement of certain syllables in the melismata in his version and in the Walsh first edition.

A performance takes about five minutes.

The aria has been recorded by many artists, and is featured in several films including Farinelli; All Things Fair by Bo Widerberg; L.I.E. by Michael Cuesta; Antichrist and Nymphomaniac, both by Lars von Trier.

Libretto

Cardinal Benedetto Pamphili's text and lyrics for the 1707 version of the aria are:

Lascia la spina, cogli la rosa;
tu vai cercando il tuo dolor.
Canuta brina per mano ascosa, 
giungerà quando nol crede il cuor.
Leave the thorn, pluck the rose;
you go searching for your pain.
Hoary frost by hidden hand
will come when your heart doesn't expect it.

Handel's 1739 pasticcio Giove in Argo also has a "Lascia la spina" aria, but a shorter one, less known, and set to a different melody.

The libretto for Rinaldo was written by Giacomo Rossi from a scenario provided by Aaron Hill.  Almirena is addressing the Saracen king of Jerusalem, Argante, who is holding her prisoner and has just disclosed his passion at first sight for her.

Rossi's Italian text
Lascia ch'io pianga
mia cruda sorte,
e che sospiri
la libertà.

Il duolo infranga
queste ritorte,
de' miei martiri
sol per pietà.
Literal translation
Let me weep over
my cruel fate,
and let me sigh for
liberty.

May sorrow shatter
these chains,
of my torments
out of pity alone.
Hill's original text
Permit the wretched to complain
Of their unhappy fate;
The loss of liberty's a pain
That should our sights create.

When you wou'd comfort an afflicted mind,
Pity, not love, shou'd make you kind.

Notes

References

Sources

External links

, Sandrine Piau with the Akademie für Alte Musik Berlin,  conducting

Arias by George Frideric Handel
Opera excerpts
Compositions in F major
1705 compositions
Soprano arias